Nurit Karlin (26 December 1938 - 30 April 2019) was an Israeli cartoonist, known for her cartoons in The New Yorker.

Karlin joined The New Yorker as a regular cartoonist in 1974 and worked there for fourteen years.

She wrote the 1996 children's book The Fat Cat Sat on the Mat.

References 

1938 births
2019 deaths
Israeli cartoonists
The New Yorker cartoonists
Israeli women illustrators
Israeli women children's writers